Omega Fornacis, which is Latinized from ω Fornacis, is a wide binary star system in the southern constellation of Fornax. It has a blue-white hue and is faintly visible to the naked eye as a fifth-magnitude star. The system lies at a distance of approximately 470 light years from the Sun based on parallax, and is drifting further away with a radial velocity of +10 km/s.

The dual nature of this system was discovered in 1836 by John Herschel. As of 2013, the two components had an angular separation of  along a position angle of 246°.

The magnitude 4.95 primary, designated component A, is a chemically peculiar B-type main-sequence star with a stellar classification of B9V It has 3.4 times the Sun's mass and is radiating around 268 times the luminosity of the Sun from its photosphere at an effective temperature of 10,910 K. Component B, the magnitude 7.71 secondary, is an A-type main-sequence star with a class of A3V. It is smaller than the primary, but has a higher projected rotational velocity.

References

B-type main-sequence stars
A-type main-sequence stars
Chemically peculiar stars
Binary stars

Fornax (constellation)
Fornacis, Omega
Durchmusterung objects
016046
011918
0749